Tappeh Mohammadi (also Romanized as Tappeh Moḩammadī and Tappeh-ye Moḩammadī; also known as Tabrīz Kūchak, Towbeh-ye Moḩammad, and Tūbeh Muhammad) is a village in Najafabad Rural District, in the Central District of Bijar County, Kurdistan Province, Iran. At the 2006 census, its population was 135, in 29 families. The village is populated by Kurds.

References 

Towns and villages in Bijar County
Kurdish settlements in Kurdistan Province